Attunga is a small farming community in the New England region of New South Wales Australia.

History 
The name is an Aboriginal word for "a high place", and was originally the name for a nearby farm operated by pastoralist John Brown in the 1840s. The land had previously been part of a  grant to the Australian Agricultural Company in 1834 and had been used to graze 6,000 sheep.

The village of Attunga was gazetted in 1847 but early settlement appears to have been slow. The first recorded burials at the Attunga Cemetery date from 1872 with the earliest inscriptions dated 1881. BHP opened a limestone quarry there in 1919.

Population growth remained slow until the mid-twentieth century. The current population of 633 includes families of commuters to Tamworth. Services in Attunga currently include a primary school, supermarket, hotel and sports ground, and rural fire service headquarters.

The late English singer-songwriter Max Bygraves owned "Attunga Park", an 84-hectare farm near the town of Murwillumbah.

Industries 
The main industries are sheep and cattle farming, and limestone mining from a mine to the east of the town. The town abuts the Attunga State Forest, a popular walking and camping destination.

The town was served by the Barraba branch railway line until the local station was closed in 1985.

Environmental issues 
Recent drought conditions have caused bank erosion along Attunga Creek, as a result of stock movements across and along the creek bed. In 2006 the town of Attunga received funding for a major program of bank stabilisation and revegetation to restrict stock movements to defined corridors near the waterway.

Mobile Phone Blackspot Program
Vodafone will serve the town and surrounding area with mobile phone service as part of the National Blackspot Program from Q4 2016.

References 

Suburbs of Tamworth, New South Wales
Towns in New South Wales
Mining towns in New South Wales